Anna Wallentheim is a Swedish teacher and politician who serves in the Riksdag with the Social Democrats since 2014.

References  

1985 births
Women members of the Riksdag
Members of the Riksdag from the Social Democrats
21st-century Swedish women politicians
Living people
Members of the Riksdag 2014–2018
Members of the Riksdag 2018–2022
Members of the Riksdag 2022–2026